The Bitch Is Back is a studio album by American heavy metal band Bitch, released in 1987 on Metal Blade Records. It gets its name from the cover version of the Elton John song "The Bitch Is Back". AllMusic's Alex Henderson gave the records 4.5 stars, calling it a reminder of "how brutally fun real metal can be".

Track listing
All songs written and arranged by Bitch, except where noted.

Side one
 "Do You Want to Rock" - 3:44
 "Hot and Heavy" - 4:25
 "Me and the Boys" - 3:27
 "Storm Raging Up" - 5:58

Side two
"The Bitch Is Back" (Elton John, Bernie Taupin) - 3:13
 "Head Banger" - 3:28
 "Fist to Face" - 4:14
 "Turns Me On" (David Carruth) - 4:09
 "Skullcrusher" - 4:06

Personnel

Band members
Betsy Bitch - lead vocals
David Carruth - guitar
Ron Cordy - bass
Robby Settles - drums

Additional musicians
Mick Adrian - additional background vocals
Joe Romersa - keyboards on "Storm Raging Up", "Hot and Heavy", and "Skullcrusher", additional backing vocals
Stanley 'Dad of a Bitch' Weiss - saxophone on "The Bitch Is Back"

Production
Joe Romersa - producer
Bill Metoyer - engineer
Kevin Beauchamp, Scott Campbell, Kevin Paulakovich - assistant engineers
John Scarpati - Photography (Front and Back Cover)

References

1987 albums
Metal Blade Records albums